Witoldowo may refer to the following places:
Witoldowo, Bydgoszcz County in Kuyavian-Pomeranian Voivodeship (north-central Poland)
Witoldowo, Radziejów County in Kuyavian-Pomeranian Voivodeship (north-central Poland)
Witoldowo, Gmina Brześć Kujawski in Kuyavian-Pomeranian Voivodeship (north-central Poland)
Witoldowo, Greater Poland Voivodeship (west-central Poland)